Clifford Evans (1913–2006, born George Clifford Evans) was a British ecologist.  He was President of the British Ecological Society (1975-1976) and Chairman of the British Photobiological Society (1979-1981).  He was a fellow and Bursar of St John's College, Cambridge, who hold his portrait, and wrote the textbook The Quantitative Analysis of Plant Growth. An obituary by the Department of Plant Sciences also cited his work on sunflecks and light interception in forest understories as particularly important.

He was buried in the churchyard of Coton, Cambridgeshire. His papers are held by the University of Cambridge.

References

1913 births
2006 deaths
British ecologists
Fellows of St John's College, Cambridge
British botanists
Place of birth missing